"Black Hole Sun" is a song by American rock band Soundgarden. Written by frontman Chris Cornell, the song was released in 1994 as the third single from the band's fourth studio album, Superunknown (1994). Considered to be the band's signature song, it topped the Billboard Album Rock Tracks chart, where it spent a total of seven weeks at number one. Despite peaking at number two on the Billboard Modern Rock Tracks chart, "Black Hole Sun" finished as the number-one track of 1994 for that listing. Worldwide, the single reached the top 10 in Australia, Canada, France, and Ireland, while in Iceland, it reached number one.

"Black Hole Sun" was included on Soundgarden's 1997 greatest hits album A-Sides and also appeared on the 2010 compilation album Telephantasm.

Origin and recording
"Black Hole Sun" was written by frontman Chris Cornell. In 2014, Cornell explained the song's origins to Uncut Magazine:

Cornell said that he wrote the song in about 15 minutes. He used a Gretsch guitar to write the song, and commented, "I wrote the song thinking the band wouldn't like it—then it became the biggest hit of the summer." Cornell came up with the song while using a Leslie speaker. Guitarist Kim Thayil said that the Leslie model 16 speaker was perfect for the song as "it's very Beatlesque and has a distinctive sound. It ended up changing the song completely." Thayil said that the song "wasn't safe as milk, but it wasn't glass in someone's eye either. It was the spoonful of sugar that helps the medicine go down. Now it's the 'Dream On' of our set." The song was performed in a slightly sharp drop D tuning, similar to the tuning used on the band's first single, "Hunted Down". Drummer Matt Cameron called the song "a huge departure". Credit is due to Michael Beinhorn and Brendan O'Brien, producer and recording engineer, respectively.

Appearing on The Pods & Sods Network in July 2017, Beinhorn detailed the process of recording Superunknown and shared his reaction to first hearing "Black Hole Sun": "I think for the rest of my entire life, until I draw my last breath, I'll never ever forgot how I felt when they started playing that song. From the very first few notes, I felt like I'd been hit by a thunderbolt. I was just absolutely stunned. What in the world is this? I get goosebumps thinking about it now."

Composition

Musically, "Black Hole Sun" has been described as grunge, psychedelic rock, alternative rock, and hard rock. Regarding the song's lyrics, Cornell stated, "It's just sort of a surreal dreamscape, a weird, play-with-the-title kind of song." He also said that "lyrically it's probably the closest to me just playing with words for words' sake, of anything I've written. I guess it worked for a lot of people who heard it, but I have no idea how you'd begin to take that one literally." In another interview he elaborated further, stating, "It's funny because hits are usually sort of congruent, sort of an identifiable lyric idea, and that song pretty much had none. The chorus lyric is kind of beautiful and easy to remember. Other than that, I sure didn't have an understanding of it after I wrote it. I was just sucked in by the music and I was painting a picture with the lyrics. There was no real idea to get across." Commenting upon how the song was misinterpreted as being positive, Cornell said, "No one seems to get this, but 'Black Hole Sun' is sad. But because the melody is really pretty, everyone thinks it's almost chipper, which is ridiculous." When asked about the line, "Times are gone for honest men", Cornell said:

It's really difficult for a person to create their own life and their own freedom. It's going to become more and more difficult, and it's going to create more and more disillusioned people who become dishonest and angry and are willing to fuck the next guy to get what they want. There's so much stepping on the backs of other people in our profession. We've been so lucky that we've never had to do that. Part of it was because of our own tenacity, and part of it was because we were lucky.

Release and critical reception
"Black Hole Sun" was released in mid-1994 and became the most successful song from Superunknown on the American rock charts and arguably the band's most recognizable and popular song. It appeared on Billboard magazine's Hot 100 Airplay chart, reaching the top 30. The following week it debuted on the Top 40 Mainstream, where it peaked at number nine in its eighth week and remained on the chart until its 20th week. The song peaked at number one on the Billboard Mainstream Rock Tracks chart and number two on the Billboard Modern Rock Tracks chart. The song spent a total of seven weeks at number one on the Mainstream Rock chart. At the 1995 Grammy Awards, "Black Hole Sun" received the award for Best Hard Rock Performance and received a nomination for Best Rock Song.

Outside the United States, the single was released in Australia, France, Germany, and the United Kingdom. In Canada, the song reached the top 10 on the RPM 100 Hit Tracks chart. It remained in the top 10 for three weeks and became the band's highest-charting song in Canada. "Black Hole Sun" reached the UK top 20 and was the last single from the album that charted in the UK top 20; it remains the band's highest charting single in the UK. "Black Hole Sun" debuted at number 10 in Australia but quickly descended the chart; however, widespread airplay and a promotional visit to Australia stimulated a resurgence of interest in Superunknown. "Black Hole Sun" would peak at number six on the Australian Singles Chart. "Black Hole Sun" reached the top 30 in Germany, the Netherlands, and New Zealand, and was a top-10 success in France and Ireland. It topped the Icelandic Singles Chart for a week and was a moderate top-20 success in Sweden. The single has sold over three million copies worldwide.

Greg Prato of AllMusic called the song "one of the few bright spots" of mid-1994, when "the world was still reeling from Nirvana leader Kurt Cobain's suicide the previous April". He said, "The song had a psychedelic edge to it (especially evident in the verse's guitar part), as the composition shifted between sedate melodicism and gargantuan guitar riffs. The lyrics were classic Chris Cornell—lines didn't exactly make sense on paper but did within the song." Ann Powers of Blender proclaimed that "Cornell's fixation with the Beatles pays off with the hit single 'Black Hole Sun' ". James Masterton wrote in his weekly UK chart commentary, "Easily the most commercial single the US band have released to date". Jon Pareles of The New York Times said, "The Beatles' techniques—fuzz-toned low chords, legato lead-guitar hooks and lumpy Ringo Starr-style drumming...are linked to Lennon-style melody in 'Black Hole Sun'." J.D. Considine of Rolling Stone stated, "With its yearning, Lennonesque melody and watery, Harrison-style guitar, 'Black Hole Sun' is a wonderful exercise in Beatleisms; trouble is, it's not a very good song, offering more in the way of mood and atmosphere than melodic direction."

The solo for "Black Hole Sun", performed by Thayil, was ranked number 63 on Guitar Worlds list of the "100 Greatest Guitar Solos", and number 56 on Total Guitars list of the "100 Hottest Guitar Solos". The song was included on VH1's countdown of the "100 Greatest Songs of the '90s" at number 25. It was also included on VH1's countdown of the "100 Greatest Hard Rock Songs" at number 77. According to Nielsen Music's year-end report for 2019, "Black Hole Sun" was the ninth most-played song of the decade on mainstream rock radio with 125,000 spins. All of the songs in the top 10 were from the 1990s. In 2017, Billboard ranked the song number four on their list of the 15 greatest Soundgarden songs, and in 2021, Kerrang ranked the song number one on their list of the 20 greatest Soundgarden songs.

Music video
The surreal and apocalyptic music video for "Black Hole Sun" was directed by British video director Howard Greenhalgh, produced by Megan Hollister for Why Not Films (London, England), shot by Ivan Bartos, and features post-production work by 525 Post Production (Hollywood, California) and Soho 601 Effects (London). The video follows a suburban neighborhood and its vain inhabitants with comically exaggerated grins, which are eventually swallowed up when the Sun suddenly turns into a black hole, while the band performs the song somewhere in an open field. In the video, Cornell can be seen wearing a fork necklace given to him by Shannon Hoon of Blind Melon. In an online chat, the band stated that the video "was entirely the director's idea", and added, "Our take on it was that at that point in making videos, we just wanted to pretend to play and not look that excited about it." They said that the video was one of the few Soundgarden videos the band was satisfied with.

The video was released in June 1994. After several weeks of airplay on MTV, a second version of the video was substituted containing more elaborate visual effects than the original, including the addition of a computer-generated black hole. The music video for "Black Hole Sun" became a hit on MTV and received the award for Best Metal/Hard Rock Video at the 1994 MTV Video Music Awards. In 1995, it received the Clio Award for Alternative Music Video. The video is available on the CD-ROM Alive in the Superunknown.

Accolades
The information regarding accolades attributed to "Black Hole Sun" is adapted in part from Acclaimed Music.

Track listing
All songs were written by Chris Cornell except where noted.CD (Europe and Germany) "Black Hole Sun"  – 5:18
 "Like Suicide" (acoustic)  – 6:11
 "Kickstand" (live) (Cornell, Kim Thayil)  – 1:58
 Recorded live on August 20, 1993, at Jones Beach Amphitheater in Wantagh, New YorkCD (Europe) "Black Hole Sun"  – 5:18
 "Jesus Christ Pose" (live) (Matt Cameron, Cornell, Ben Shepherd, Thayil)  – 7:19
 Recorded live on August 11, 1993, at Rushmore Plaza Civic Center in Rapid City, South Dakota
 "My Wave" (live) (Cornell, Thayil)  – 4:34
 Recorded live on August 20, 1993, at Jones Beach Amphitheater in Wantagh, New York
 "Spoonman" (Steve Fisk remix)  – 6:55Box set (UK) "Black Hole Sun"  – 5:18
 "Beyond the Wheel" (live)  – 5:56
 Recorded live on August 18, 1993, at Exhibition Stadium in Toronto, Canada
 "Fell on Black Days" (live)  – 4:45
 Recorded live on August 16, 1993, at Pine Knob Music Theatre in Clarkston, Michigan
 "Birth Ritual" (demo) (Cornell, Cameron, Thayil)  – 5:50CD (Australia and Germany) "Black Hole Sun"  – 5:18
 "Jesus Christ Pose" (live) (Cameron, Cornell, Shepherd, Thayil)  – 7:19
 "Beyond the Wheel" (live)  – 5:54
 Recorded live on August 18, 1993, at Exhibition Stadium in Toronto, Ontario, Canada7-inch vinyl (UK) and cassette (UK) "Black Hole Sun"  – 5:18
 "My Wave" (live) (Cornell, Thayil)  – 4:34
 Recorded live on August 20, 1993, at Jones Beach Amphitheater in Wantagh, New York
 "Beyond the Wheel" (live)  – 5:54
 Recorded live on August 18, 1993, at Exhibition Stadium in Toronto, Ontario, Canada7-inch vinyl (US)'''
 "Black Hole Sun"  – 5:18
 "Spoonman"  – 4:06

Charts

Weekly charts

Year-end charts

Decade-end charts

Certifications

Release history

In popular culture
"Black Hole Sun" is a playable song in the 2007 video game Rock Band.

The song is also available in the 2008 video games Karaoke Revolution Presents: American Idol Encore and SingStar 90s, for the PlayStation 2. Guitar Hero: Warriors of Rock features the song in its downloadable content library, and it is a playable track in the TV mode of Guitar Hero Live. The post-humous cover album released by Chris Cornell, No One Sings Like You Anymore, Vol. 1, was named after a lyric in this song. The song was featured in "The Alternative Polka" from "Weird Al" Yankovic's 1996 album, Bad Hair Day.

A cover version of the song by Swann and Nouela was featured over the closing credits in the neo-noir thriller A Walk Among the Tombstones. Another cover in the style of lounge music was performed by Steve Lawrence and Eydie Gorme. This cover was also used in the closing credits of the fourth episode of the Disney+ Willow series.

The song is used in Season 3 of the Apple TV+ series For All Mankind'' as soundtrack for the scene at the end of Episode 3 when the competing spaceships set off to Mars. It is also sampled as the soundtrack to the Season 3 trailer.

References

External links
 

1994 singles
1994 songs
A&M Records singles
American psychedelic rock songs
Grammy Award for Best Hard Rock Performance
Music videos directed by Howard Greenhalgh
Number-one singles in Iceland
Song recordings produced by Chris Cornell
Song recordings produced by Michael Beinhorn
Songs written by Chris Cornell
Soundgarden songs